Thaddeus Mortimer Fowler, often credited as T.M. Fowler, (1842–1922) was an American cartographer. He is best known for his work on panoramic maps. A large portion of his work focused around Pennsylvania. He is considered the most prolific maker of Pennsylvania panoramas of the mid 19th-century.

Early life
Fowler was born in Lowell, Massachusetts. He was a soldier in the United States Civil War. He was injured during battle. He worked for his uncle who was a photographer.

Career

Fowler started his own business as a cartographer focusing on panoramic maps. His photographer uncle also worked for the firm. The business was located in Madison, Wisconsin. He made maps for Canada and 21 different United States states.
The Library of Congress maintains an extensive collection of his works, the largest collection of panoramic maps in the library's collection.
 His work is also held in the collection of Pennsylvania State University, Yale University, and the Boston Public Library.

Personal life 
Fowler lived in Lewisburg, Pennsylvania and Shamokin, Pennsylvania from 1881 until 1885. He also lived in Trenton, New Jersey. In 1885 he moved to Morrisville, Pennsylvania. He lived in Morrisville, where his business was located, until 1910. Fowler died in New York in 1922.

References

People from Lowell, Massachusetts
1842 births
1922 deaths
American cartographers
People of Massachusetts in the American Civil War